The Beast Beneath is a 2020 American made-for-television horror film written and directed by Dustin Ferguson, starring Mel Novak and Brinke Stevens. It premiered on After Hours Cinema on WGUD-TV August 7, 2020.

Synopsis
A deadly earthquake rocks a small, isolated, resort town and awakens a 2000 year old prehistoric creature to feast on the local community. It's up to a brilliant scientist Charlene (Brinke Stevens) and her younger brother Aaron (Eric Prochnau) to solve the mystery and put a stop to the monster's carnage before its too late, all while the devious town Mayor Reid (Mel Novak) attempts to cover up the ancient beast's bloody tracks.

Cast
 Mel Novak as Mayor George Reid
 Brinke Stevens as Charlene Brinkeman
 Shawn C. Phillips as Jake
 Jennifer Nangle as Sally
 Sheri Davis as Cheryl
 Mike Ferguson as Tom Lee
 Lee Turner as Lieutenant Turner
 Eric Prochnau as Aaron

References

External links

2020 films
2020 horror films
2020 television films
American horror television films
2020s English-language films
2020s American films